The 2015 Women's World Draughts Championship match  at the international draughts was held April 1–8, 2015 in Zerendi, Kazakhstan International Draughts Federation FMJD between the actual World Champion Zoja Golubeva (Latvia) and the challenger Tamara Tansykkuzhina (Russia). Zoya Golubeva won with a score of 8 : 4 and became the world champion for the fifteenth time.

Rules and regulations
The match consists of seven micro-matches. Each micro-match is played till the first victory.
First game — standard game 1 hour 20 min + 1 min per move, if draw at 1st game — rapid game 20 min + 5 sec per move. If draw at rapid game — blitz game 5 min + 3 sec per move.

If draw at blitz game — Lehmann-Georgiev tie break 5 min + 2 sec per move on all games.

The total prize fund was 15.000 euros. From this fund the winner gets 8.000 euros, and the loser 7.000.

Results

See also
List of women's Draughts World Championship winners
Women's World Draughts Championship

References

External links
The match

2015 in draughts
Draughts world championships
Sport in Astana
2015 in Kazakhstani sport
International sports competitions hosted by Kazakhstan